The David Gemmell Awards for Fantasy, established in memory of David Gemmell, were awarded from 2009 to 2018. In 2009, only the Legend Award for best fantasy novel was awarded. Beginning in 2010 the Morningstar Award for Best Fantasy Newcomer and the Ravenheart Award for Best Fantasy Cover Art were added.  The award was closed in 2019.

The awards were for fantasy novels in the traditional, heroic, epic or high genres, or in the spirit of Gemmell's own work.

Winners and nominations

2009
The 2009 award (best novel only) was presented in June 2009. 
 Best novel: Andrzej Sapkowski for Blood of Elves
 Nominated: Juliet Marillier for Heir to Sevenwaters
 Nominated: Brandon Sanderson for The Hero of Ages
 Nominated: Joe Abercrombie for Last Argument of Kings
 Nominated: Brent Weeks for The Way of Shadows

2010
The 2010 awards were presented in June 2010. 
 Best novel: Graham McNeill for Empire
 Nominated: Joe Abercrombie for Best Served Cold
 Nominated: Pierre Pevel for The Cardinal's Blades
 Nominated: Robert Jordan & Brandon Sanderson for The Gathering Storm
 Nominated: Brandon Sanderson for Warbreaker
 Best newcomer: Pierre Pevel for The Cardinal's Blades
 Nominated: Stephen Deas for The Adamantine Palace
 Nominated: Amanda Downum for The Drowning City
 Nominated: Ken Scholes for Lamentation
 Nominated: Jesse Bullington for The Sad Tale of the Brothers Grossbart
 Cover art: Didier Graffet, Dave Senior and Laura Brett for Best Served Cold (written by Joe Abercrombie)

2011
The 2011 awards were presented in June 2011. 
 Best novel: Brandon Sanderson for The Way of Kings
 Nominated: Pierre Pevel for The Alchemist in the Shadows
 Nominated: Brent Weeks for The Black Prism
 Nominated: Peter V. Brett for The Desert Spear
 Nominated: Robert Jordan & Brandon Sanderson for Towers of Midnight
 Nominated: Markus Heitz for The War of the Dwarves
 Best newcomer: Darius Hinks for Warrior Priest
 Nominated: N.K. Jemisin for The Hundred Thousand Kingdoms
 Nominated: Alexey Pehov for Shadow Prowler
 Nominated: Blake Charlton for Spellwright
 Nominated: Mary Victoria for Tymon's Flight
 Cover art: Olof Erla Einarsdottir for Power and Majesty (written by Tansy Rayner Roberts)

2012
The 2012 awards were presented in June 2012. 
 Best novel: Patrick Rothfuss for The Wise Man's Fear
 Nominated: Brandon Sanderson for The Alloy of Law
 Nominated: Kristen Britain for Blackveil
 Nominated: Joe Abercrombie for The Heroes
 Nominated: William King for Blood of Aenarion
 Best newcomer: Helen Lowe for The Heir of Night
 Nominated: Douglas Hulick for Among Thieves
 Nominated: Mark Lawrence for Prince of Thorns
 Nominated: Elspeth Cooper for Songs of the Earth
 Nominated: Peter Orullian for The Unremembered
 Cover art: Raymond Swanland for Blood of Aenarion (written by William King)

2013
The 2013 awards were presented in October 2013. 
 Best novel: Brent Weeks for The Blinding Knife
 Nominated: Helen Lowe for The Gathering of the Lost
 Nominated: Mark Lawrence for King of Thorns
 Nominated: Joe Abercrombie for Red Country
 Nominated: Jay Kristoff for Stormdancer
 Best newcomer: John Gwynne for Malice
 Nominated: Aidan Harte for Irenicon
 Nominated: Miles Cameron for The Red Knight
 Nominated: Jay Kristoff for Stormdancer
 Nominated: Saladin Ahmed for Throne of the Crescent Moon
 Cover art: Didier Graffet and Dave Senior for Red Country (written by Joe Abercrombie)

2014
The 2014 awards were presented in June 2014. 
 Best novel: Mark Lawrence for Emperor of Thorns
 Nominated: Peter V. Brett for The Daylight War
 Nominated: Robert Jordan & Brandon Sanderson for A Memory of Light
 Nominated: Scott Lynch for The Republic of Thieves
 Nominated: Adrian Tchaikovsky for War Master's Gate
 Best newcomer: Brian McClellan for Promise of Blood
 Nominated: Mark T. Barnes for The Garden of Stones
 Nominated: Luke Scull for The Grim Company
 Nominated: David Guymer for Headtaker
 Nominated: Antoine Rouaud for The Path of Anger
 Cover art: Jason Chan for Emperor of Thorns (written by Mark Lawrence)

2015
The 2015 awards were presented in August 2015. 
 Best novel: Brandon Sanderson for Words of Radiance
 Nominated: Joe Abercrombie for Half a King
 Nominated: John Gwynne for Valour
 Nominated: Mark Lawrence for Prince of Fools
 Nominated: Brent Weeks for The Broken Eye
 Best newcomer: Brian Staveley for The Emperor's Blades
 Nominated: Sebastien de Castell for Traitor's Blade
 Nominated: Kameron Hurley for The Mirror Empire
 Nominated: Ben Peek for The Godless
 Nominated: Angus Watson for Age of Iron
 Cover art: Sam Green for Words of Radiance (written by Brandon Sanderson)

2016
The 2016 awards were presented in September 2016. 
 Best novel: Mark Lawrence for The Liar’s Key
 Nominated: Miles Cameron for The Dread Wyrm
 Nominated: Larry Correia for Son of the Black Sword
 Nominated: David Guymer for Gotrex & Felix: Slayer
 Nominated: John Gwynne for Ruin
 Best newcomer: Peter Newman for The Vagrant
 Nominated: Stephen Aryan for Battlemage
 Nominated: Seth Dickinson for The Traitor Baru Cormorant
 Nominated: Francesca Haig for The Fire Sermon
 Nominated: Lucy Hounsom for Starborn
 Nominated: Sabaa Tahir for An Ember in the Ashes
 Cover art: Jason Chan for The Liar’s Key (written by Mark Lawrence)

2017
The 2017 awards were presented in July 2017.
 Best novel: Gav Thorpe for Warbeast
 Nominated: John Gwynne for Wrath
 Nominated: Jay Kristoff for Nevernight
 Nominated: Mark Lawrence for The Wheel of Osheim
 Nominated: Brandon Sanderson for The Bands of Mourning
 Best newcomer: Megan E O'Keefe for Steal the Sky
 Nominated: Mark de Jager for Infernal
 Nominated: Christopher Husberg for Duskfall
 Nominated: Adrian Selby for Snakewood
 Nominated: Jon Skovron for Hope and Red
 Cover art: Alessandro Baldasseroni for Black Rift (written by Josh Reynolds)

2018

The 2018 David Gemmell Awards winners were announced at a ceremony July 14, 2018 at Edge-Lit 7 in Derby, UK:
 Best Novel: Robin Hobb for Assassin's Fate
 Nominated: Miles Cameron for Fall of Dragons
 Nominated: Mark Lawrence for  Red Sister
 Nominated: Steve McHugh for Scorched Shadows
 Nominated: Brandon Sanderson for Oathbringer
 Best newcomer: Nicholas Eames for Kings of the Wyld
 Nominated: RJ Barker for Age of Assassins
 Nominated: Melissa Caruso for The Tethered Mage
 Nominated: Ed McDonald for Blackwing
 Nominated: Anna Smith Spark for The Court of Broken Knives
Cover art: Richard Anderson for Kings of the Wyld by Nicholas Eames
 Nominated: Kerem Beyit for The Fall of Dragons by Miles Cameron
 Nominated: Sam Green for Oathbringer by Brandon Sanderson
 Nominated: Jackie Morris and Stephen Raw for Assassin’s Fate by Robin Hobb
 Nominated: Kerby Rosanes for Godsgrave by Jay Kristoff

References

External links
The David Gemmell Awards for Fantasy 

British speculative fiction awards
Awards established in 2009